Christian Adán Ortega Ruíz (born February 25, 1992, in León, Guanajuato) is a former Mexican professional footballer who last played for Sonora of Ascenso MX. He made his professional debut with Querétaro during a Copa MX draw against Correcaminos UAT on 31 July 2012.

References

Living people
1992 births
Mexican footballers
Querétaro F.C. footballers
Cimarrones de Sonora players
Ascenso MX players
Tercera División de México players
Footballers from Guanajuato
Sportspeople from León, Guanajuato
Association footballers not categorized by position